The Lebanese Academy of Fine Arts (ALBA;) was originally a stand-alone Lebanese institute, now one of the faculties at the University of Balamand, teaching courses in fine art. It was founded in 1937, and it was the first national institution of higher education in Lebanon. In 1988, it joined the University of Balamand during its foundation as one of the three founding faculties at the time.

The faculty currently offers several programs in French in its original location in Sin el Fil, Beirut. They include, but are not limited to, architecture, decorative arts, plastic arts, urban and regional planning, Graphic Design, Digital art direction, Fashion design and audiovisual directing. In October 2000, the University of Balamand launched new programs in English for the faculty at its main campus in El-Koura, which now consists of Architecture, Interior Architecture, Graphic Design and Computer Graphics And Interactive Media.

History 

Founded in 1937 by a group of young classical musicians led by the engineer Alexis Boutros.

Details on the foundations of its fields 

In 1943, a branch of architecture was sponsored by the famous French engineer Daniel Abou Dargham.

In 1948, the school of letters was created which graduated specialists in literature, history and geography.

There followed in 1949 by the school of political and economic science.

In 1950, the academy set up a school of law, which was forced to close later in 1959.

In a later stage, additional fields of study were added to the basic core such as the school of classic dance, the school of acting and the school of sculpture.

The academy added new sections of publicity and information in 1975, and audio-visual production in 1987, and urban studies in 1994

Soon after the death of Alexis Boutros, Mr. Georges Haddad was appointed dean of Alba in 1979. He struggled during the civil war to keep the programs running. He managed to achieve the fusion with University of Balamand in 1988.

In 2000, the Academy started offering the "Interior Architecture and design and Graphic Design" programs in English under supervision of Mr. George Fiani.

In 2009, the Architecture and CGIM programs were offered at Balamand Campus. The same year, The long-time caretaker of ALBA, Mr. George Haddad died.

Mr. Bekhazi was shortly after appointed "Dean of ALBA" by the University of Balamand.

In 2014, mr. George Fiani was appointed Director of AlBA-Balamand Campus

Administrative formation 

Dr. Elias L. Warrak, President of UOB,

Pr. André Bekhazi, Dean of ALBA- Sin el Fil Campus,

Mr. George Fiani, Director of ALBA- Balamand Campus,

Alongside a great administrative and educational body, on both campuses, working, aiming and aiding the higher officers to achieve better educational experience day-by-day...

Current Programs 

Majors offered at ALBA-Sin el Fil Campus (French Programs)/ Pr. André Bekhazi:

1- Architecture:
     Architecture	 DES Architecture, Master
2- Arts Décoratifs:
   Section Arts Graphiques et Publicité:	 	
     Creation Publicitaire	 License, Master
     Graphisme/ Création Assistée par Ordinateur	 License	
     Illustration - Bande Dessinée	 License, Master	
     Animation 2D/3D	 License, Master	
     Graphisme-Multimédia-Réseaux Sociaux	 License, Master	
     Photographie	 License, Master	
     Direction Artistique	 Master	
 	 	
   Section Architecture d'intérieur et Design produit:	 	
     Architecture d'intérieur	 License, Master	
     Design produit	 Master	
 	 	
3- Arts Plastiques et Appliqués:
   Arts Plastiques	 License, Master	
   Arts Appliqués	 Master	
   Nouveaux Médias	 Master	
 	 	
4- Cinema et Réalisation Audiovisuelle: 	
   Realisation Audiovisuelle	 License	
   Réalisation Cinema	 Master	
   Production 	 Master
   Réalisation	 Master	
 	 	
5- Urbanisme:	 	
   Urbanisme	 Master	
   Aménagement du Paysage	 Master	
 	
Majors offered at ALBA-:Balamand Campus (English Programs)/ Mr. George Fiani:
 
1- Graphic Design	   BFA, MFA	

2- Interior Architecture and Design	  BFA, MFA
	
3- Architecture		  B.S Architecture, M.ARCH

4- Computer Graphics and Interactive Media	  BFA, MFA

5- Art Teaching Diploma	  TD

Additional references 
 University of Balamand: Lebanese Academy of Fine Arts website—
 Alba.edu.lb: Lebanese Academy of Fine Arts website
 Lebweb.com: Lebanese Academy of Fine Arts
 Cin.org: University of Balamand

References

Art schools in Lebanon
University of Balamand
Schools in Beirut
1937 establishments in Lebanon
Arts organizations established in 1937
Educational institutions established in 1937